MKS Dąbrowa Górnicza is a Polish professional basketball team based in Dąbrowa Górnicza. The team currently plays in the PLK since 2014.

History
The basketball section of MKS Dąbrowa Górnicza was found in 1992. In 2003, the club started acting on the national third level. It played for several years in the 2 Liga, until the team won the championship in 2007–08 and was promoted.

The team remained in the 1 Liga for the next 6 seasons. In 2009–10 the team was close to promotion to the PLK but failed to beat Siarka Tarnobrzeg.

MKS was offered a spot in the 2014–15 PLK season as a wild card because of the expansion from 12 to 16 teams.

Players

Current roster

Honours
Alpe Adria Cup
Champions (1): 2022–23

Season by season

Notable players

 Rashaun Broadus
 Kerron Johnson

References

Basketball teams in Poland
Dąbrowa Górnicza